The Adrian Bulldogs football program is a college football team that represents Adrian College in the Michigan Intercollegiate Athletic Association, a part of the Division III (NCAA).  The team has had 24 head coaches since its first recorded football game in 1892.  The current coach is Jim Deere who first took the position for the 2010 season.

Key

Coaches

Details
The following are details on coaches that do not have articles on Wikipedia.  For coaches with articles on Wikipedia, see links in the table above.

Coach Huffstrater
An individual with the last name "Huffstrater" was the head coach for 5 seasons, from 1906 until 1910.  His coaching record at Adrian was 7 wins, 15 losses and 4 ties.  As of the conclusion of the 2010 season, this ranks him #12 at Adrian in total wins and #15 at the school in winning percentage.

Coach Brown
A coach with the last name "Brown" was in the position for the 1913 season.  Brown's coaching record at Adrian was 2 wins and 4 losses.  As of the conclusion of the 2010 season, this ranks him #21 at Adrian in total wins and #16 at the school in winning percentage."

Notes

References

Adrian

Adrian Bulldogs head football coaches